Curtis Shayne Joseph (né Munro; born April 29, 1967) is a Canadian ice hockey coach and former professional player. Nicknamed "Cujo", Joseph was immediately recognizable on the ice for his masks featuring a snarling dog, drawing inspiration from the Stephen King novel Cujo.

Throughout his NHL career, Joseph played for a number of franchises, rising to prominence during the playoffs with the St. Louis Blues, Edmonton Oilers, and Toronto Maple Leafs. He also played for the Detroit Red Wings, Phoenix Coyotes and Calgary Flames. He last played for the Maple Leafs during the 2008–09 NHL season. He was also a member of Canada's gold medal-winning team at the 2002 Winter Olympics.

Joseph retired with the most career wins (454) of any goaltender in NHL history who never played on a Stanley Cup-winning team (which has since been surpassed by Roberto Luongo and Henrik Lundqvist), and was also the first goaltender to have 30 or more wins in a regular season for five different teams. He was also the last goaltender to have played in the NHL in the 1980s.

Early life
Joseph was born on April 29, 1967 to unmarried teenage parents. Soon after his birth, his mother, Wendy Munro, gave him up to be fostered by Jeanne and Howard Eakins. She knew Jeanne from the nursing home where they both worked and thought that the Eakinses could provide a better life for him. He was named Curtis after his birth father, Curtis Nickle. Jeanne later divorced Howard and married Harold Joseph, at which point she cut off contact with Wendy Munro and began using Joseph as Curtis's last name. In the Joseph household, Curtis grew up with two older stepbrothers, Grant and  Victor. He also has three older stepsisters and a stepbrother from a previous marriage. The family is of mixed race with Harold and Victor being black, and Grant also being an adopted child prior to Curtis Joseph. It was not until he signed with the St. Louis Blues that Joseph legally changed his surname from Munro to Joseph.

For the majority of his childhood, Curtis was raised in the East Gwillimbury community of Sharon. He initially attended Whitchurch Highlands Public School and then Huron Heights Secondary School.  Curtis grew up playing hockey for the East Gwillimbury Eagles of the OMHA until moving west to play for Notre Dame College in (Wilcox, Saskatchewan).  Although he led the Notre Dame Hounds to the Centennial Cup in 1987–88, and he played for the University of Wisconsin–Madison of the NCAA, he was undrafted by the NHL. He signed as a free agent with the Blues in 1989. In the 1989–90 season, he played 23 games with the Peoria Rivermen in the IHL.

Playing career
Nicknamed "Cujo," Joseph has worn the number 31 for the St. Louis Blues, Edmonton Oilers, Toronto Maple Leafs, Detroit Red Wings, Phoenix Coyotes, and the Calgary Flames. Joseph is a three-time NHL All-Star (1994, 1999, 2000), and he was awarded the 1999–2000 King Clancy Memorial Trophy for exemplifying leadership qualities on and off the ice and making noteworthy humanitarian contributions to his community. In the 2002 Winter Olympics held in Salt Lake City, he was a member of the Olympic Gold Medal winning Canadian men's hockey team.

University of Wisconsin 
Joseph began his college play at the University of Wisconsin. While playing for the Badgers, Joseph won 21 games and was voted to the WCHA All Conference Team. Shortly after his freshman season, Joseph, despite not having been drafted, was signed by the St. Louis Blues to a free-agent entry-level contract.

NHL career

St. Louis Blues

Joseph broke into the NHL in 1990, playing for the St. Louis Blues. In the off-season following the 1990–91 NHL season, the Blues signed Brendan Shanahan from the New Jersey Devils. Shanahan was a restricted free agent, and thus the Devils were entitled to compensation. The teams could not agree on what the compensation was; the Blues offered Curtis Joseph, Rod Brind'Amour, and two draft picks, while the Devils wanted Scott Stevens. Joseph seemed to be the answer the Devils were looking for in goal, but the case went to arbitration, and a judge ruled that Stevens was to be awarded to the Devils in September 1991.

Joseph remained with the Blues until 1995. The 1992–93 NHL season was his most successful season, as he played a key role in the upset of the Chicago Blackhawks, the reigning Clarence Campbell Conference regular season champions; the Blues swept them in four games in the first round of the playoffs. The Blues then faced the Toronto Maple Leafs in the second round, and though the Leafs prevailed, the series went to seven games thanks to Joseph's play. Because of his efforts, he was nominated as a finalist for the Vezina Trophy that season, finishing third in voting behind winner Ed Belfour and Tom Barrasso. After a disappointing first-round exit in the 1995 playoffs, St. Louis Blues coach and general manager Mike Keenan declined to re-sign Joseph and traded his rights to the Edmonton Oilers.

Edmonton Oilers
The Oilers began their training camp with two starting goaltenders, signed incumbent Bill Ranford and the unsigned Joseph. Edmonton failed to work out a contract or trade Joseph's rights, leaving Joseph without a team to start the 1995–96 season. He signed a contract with the IHL's Las Vegas Thunder and dominated, reminding the NHL that he deserved to be there. The Oilers entertained trading Joseph to the Boston Bruins but would finally sign Joseph to a contract and trade Ranford to Boston. With Edmonton, Joseph won two Zane Feldman Trophies (team MVP) and one Most Popular Player award. He backstopped the Oilers to first round playoff upsets of the Dallas Stars and Colorado Avalanche in 1997 and 1998, respectively, their first playoff series wins since 1992.

Toronto Maple Leafs
Following the 1997–98 season, Joseph signed as a free agent with the Toronto Maple Leafs. While with the Leafs, he had three consecutive seasons of 30+ wins, he was twice runner-up for the Vezina Trophy in 1999 and 2000, a finalist for the Lester B. Pearson Award in 1999, and won the King Clancy Memorial Trophy in 2000. Joseph played a key role in the Leafs' run to the Eastern Conference Finals in 1999 and 2002. In 2000, during Game One of the series against the New Jersey Devils, he was considered the deciding factor in the 2–1 win where the Leafs were outshot 33–21.

After Leafs General Manager Pat Quinn was unwilling to give Joseph a four-year contract (he offered three years), he left after the 2001–02 season to sign with the Detroit Red Wings. Some also speculated that the relationship between Quinn and Joseph was frosty because Quinn had benched Joseph in the Salt Lake City Olympics after the first game, although Joseph himself denied the rumours, saying that he played a bad first game against Sweden (losing 5–2) and that Martin Brodeur played very well for the rest of the tournament, earning his spot as the starter. Joseph's move to Detroit was highly publicized and unpopular in Toronto.

Detroit Red Wings

The Detroit Red Wings won the Stanley Cup in 2002 and entered the 2002–03 season mostly unchanged. Detroit brought in coach Dave Lewis to replace the retiring Scotty Bowman, and Joseph with a 3-year, $24 million contract to replace the newly retired Dominik Hašek. Joseph initially faltered, but eventually found his form in the latter half of the 2002–03 season to backstop his team to the division title. With an anemic offense, Detroit was upset in the first round of the playoffs in 2003 by the eventual conference champions, the Mighty Ducks of Anaheim in a four-game sweep. Detroit fans and media focused their frustration on Joseph after he was outplayed by the eventual 2003 Conn Smythe Trophy winner Jean-Sébastien Giguère.

During the 2003 off-season, Dominik Hašek announced his intentions to come out of retirement. With fears of Hašek signing with a competitor, Detroit general manager Ken Holland signed him to a contract with the intention of trading Joseph, but Joseph's large contract and off-season surgery made him unmovable. Detroit was forced to enter the 2003–04 season with two starting goaltenders earning US$8 million per year. After a stint in the minors, Joseph returned to the Red Wings lineup while Hašek was nursing a groin injury. The Red Wings plan was to attract him to other teams until Hašek returned to the lineup. In February, Hašek decided to call it quits for the season, which once again solidified Joseph's position on the Red Wings roster.

Detroit finished first overall in the league, and entered the first round of the playoffs with Manny Legace as their starting goalie. After great play in the first two games, Legace struggled in games 3 and 4. Joseph took the reins in game 5 and delivered, winning two straight and helping Detroit defeat the Nashville Predators in six games. The Red Wings were defeated in the second round of the playoffs in six games by the eventual Western Conference champions, the Calgary Flames.  Joseph was statistically the top goaltender in the 2004 playoffs.

Phoenix Coyotes
In the summer of 2005, several teams were interested in signing Joseph, including the Pittsburgh Penguins and Phoenix Coyotes.  After taking a call from the new Phoenix coach, Wayne Gretzky, Joseph signed a one-year deal with Phoenix. On October 28, 2005, he won his 400th NHL game. On March 28, 2006, he posted his 424th career win, thereby moving into sixth place on the NHL's all-time list, passing Tony Esposito. In the summer of 2006, Joseph returned to Phoenix for another season on a one-year contract.  While he was with the Coyotes, Curtis became the first goaltender to have 30 or more regular season wins for five different teams (St. Louis, Edmonton, Toronto, Detroit, and Phoenix); Joseph eventually recorded at least 50 regular season wins with each of those teams.

Calgary Flames
Joseph had shown interest in re-joining the Toronto Maple Leafs, indicating that he would be fine with a back-up role and a reduced salary. In September 2007 the Ottawa Senators quietly expressed interest in acquiring Joseph if they could unload Martin Gerber and his large contract.

On January 14, 2008, Joseph signed a one-year, US$1.5 million contract with the Calgary Flames. On March 1, 2008, Joseph moved past Terry Sawchuk for fourth place in all-time NHL wins with 448 in a 3–1 win over his former team, the Phoenix Coyotes. On April 13, 2008, Joseph replaced Miikka Kiprusoff less than four minutes into the first period of Game #3 of the Flames' first round series of the 2008 playoffs with the San Jose Sharks. Joseph backstopped the Flames to a come-from-behind 4–3 win after initially falling behind 3–0. This win made him the first goaltender to win a post-season game as a member of five different teams: St.Louis, Edmonton, Toronto, Detroit and Calgary.

Return to Toronto
On July 1, 2008, Joseph rejoined the Toronto Maple Leafs by signing a 1-year, $700,000 contract. Joseph served primarily as a back-up for most of the season, only playing 21 games. On December 30, 2008, he recorded his 450th career win in a 4–3 overtime victory against the Atlanta Thrashers, and on April 8, 2009, he recorded his 352nd NHL loss, tying Gump Worsley for the NHL record for most losses by a goaltender. Martin Brodeur subsequently set a new record and subsequently finished with 397 losses, Joseph's 352 losses were also later surpassed by Roberto Luongo who subsequently finished with 392 losses.

Joseph announced his retirement on January 12, 2010, in Toronto.  His career would end with 454 regular season wins, 5th most all time.  His 63 playoff victories are the most by a goaltender without winning a Stanley Cup.

During the 2016–17 season, Joseph was a goaltending consultant in the organization of the Carolina Hurricanes of the NHL.

International play
Joseph was a member of the Canada men's national ice hockey team, having played for the team in several international tournaments, including the 1996 Men's World Ice Hockey Championships, the 1996 World Cup of Hockey, the 2002 Winter Olympics, and the 2007 Spengler Cup. Joseph helped lead the team to the Spengler Cup championship on December 31, 2007.

Personal life
Joseph has been married twice and has seven children, including a nephew he is raising with his second wife. Joseph was previously married to Nancy. The couple had four children together before divorcing in 2009. Joseph married former Playboy playmate Stephanie Glasson in 2012. In 2014 the couple gave birth to their daughter. Curtis Joseph also has a step daughter by way of his second wife.

His autobiography, Cujo: The Untold Story of My Life On and Off the Ice, was released in 2018.

Career statistics

Regular season and playoffs

International

Awards and honours

 Inducted into St.Louis Sports Hall of Fame, 2015

See also
 List of NHL goaltenders with 300 wins
 List of National Hockey League statistical leaders

References

External links
 
 Official website 
 Curtis Joseph at HockeyGoalies.org - advanced statistics and game logs
 
 
 

1967 births
Living people
AHCA Division I men's ice hockey All-Americans
Athol Murray College of Notre Dame alumni
Calgary Flames players
Canadian adoptees
Canadian ice hockey coaches
Canadian ice hockey goaltenders
Canadian people of British descent
Canadian racehorse owners and breeders
Carolina Hurricanes coaches
Detroit Red Wings players
Edmonton Oilers players
Grand Rapids Griffins players
Ice hockey people from Ontario
Ice hockey players at the 1998 Winter Olympics
Ice hockey players at the 2002 Winter Olympics
King Clancy Memorial Trophy winners
Las Vegas Thunder players
Medalists at the 2002 Winter Olympics
National Hockey League All-Stars
Olympic gold medalists for Canada
Olympic ice hockey players of Canada
Olympic medalists in ice hockey
People from Georgina, Ontario
Peoria Rivermen (IHL) players
Phoenix Coyotes players
St. Louis Blues players
Toronto Maple Leafs players
Undrafted National Hockey League players
Wisconsin Badgers men's ice hockey players